How Did We Get So Dark? is the second studio album by British hard rock duo Royal Blood. The album was released by Warner Bros. Records on 16 June 2017.

The album is considered by most critics to be stylistically similar to the band's breakthrough debut album, with Kerr's bass serving as the music's focal point, but it incorporates more blues and psychedelic influences. It received generally positive reviews from critics and was a commercial success.

Critical reception

The album received generally positive reviews from music critics, attaining a Metacritic aggregate score of 71.

It was elected by Loudwire as the 7th best hard rock album of 2017.

Track listing

Personnel 
Royal Blood
 Mike Kerr – bass, keyboards, vocals, production
 Ben Thatcher – drums, percussion, piano, production
Production
 Tom Dalgety – production, engineering, mixing
 Jolyon Thomas – production, engineering
 Brian Lucey – mastering
 Justin Smith – engineering
 Drew Bang – engineering
 Adrian Samson – photography
 Pascal Teixeira – art direction
 Richard Welland – design

Charts

Weekly charts

Year-end charts

References

External links

Royal Blood official website
Dan Hillier official website

2017 albums
Warner Records albums
Royal Blood (band) albums
Albums produced by Tom Dalgety